Country 'Til I Die is the fifteenth studio album by American country music artist John Anderson. It was released in 1994 under the BNA Records label. The album produced the singles "Bend It Until It Breaks", "Mississippi Moon", and the title track, which respectively peaked at #3, #15, and #35 on the country singles charts. Also included were a new recording of Anderson's signature hit "Swingin'" and a cover of the Georgia Satellites hit "Keep Your Hands to Yourself".

Track listing

Personnel
As listed in the liner notes.
 
 John Anderson - lead vocals (all tracks), background vocals (all tracks)
 Eddie Bayers - drums (all tracks)
 Dennis Burnside - piano (10)
 Larry Byrom - acoustic guitar (1-9)
 Darel DeCounter - organ (9)
 Quitman Dennis - trombone (9)
 Kim Fleming - background vocals (9)
 Paul Franklin - steel guitar (1-4, 6, 8), Dobro (5, 7, 9)
 Sonny Garrish - steel guitar (10)
 Vicki Hampton - background vocals (9)
 Mike Haynes - trumpet (9)
 Jim Horn - saxophone (9)
 Dann Huff - electric guitar (1-9)
 Tracy Lawrence - duet vocals (10)
 Chris Leuzinger - electric guitar (10)
 Donna McElroy - background vocals (9)
 Terry McMillan - harmonica (5-7, 9), percussion (10)
 Michael Mellett - background vocals (9)
 Steve Nathan - organ (1-8, 10), piano (6, 9) 
 Robert Ellis Orrall - background vocals (4)
 Don Sheffield - saxophone (9)
 Gary Smith - piano (1-5, 7, 8)
 Denis Solee - saxophone (9)
 Joe Spivey - fiddle (1-4, 6, 8), acoustic guitar (10)
 Bergen White - horn arrangements (9)
 Chris Willis - background vocals (9)
 Dennis Wilson - background vocals (1-3, 6-8, 10)
 Willie Weeks - bass guitar (10)
 Glenn Worf - bass guitar (1-9)
 Curtis Wright - background vocals (4)
 Curtis Young - background vocals (1-3, 6-8, 10)

Chart performance

Album

Singles

References

[ Country 'Til I Die], Allmusic.

1994 albums
BNA Records albums
John Anderson (musician) albums
Albums produced by James Stroud